Augusta Kochanowska (6 July 1868 – 7 December 1927) was a Polish artist, known for painting and illustrations.

About 
Augusta Kochanowska was born on 6 July 1868 in Sadhora (Chernivtsi), Duchy of Bukovina, now Ukraine. From 1894 until 1899, she studied at the University of Applied Arts Vienna (also known as Kunstgewerbeschule des KK Osterr). She lived in Chernivtsi from the period 1885 until 1920, with some breaks.

Her work was influenced by Ukrainian writer Olha Kobylianska, who she met in 1874. Kochanowska made numerous illustrations for her books. 

In 2013, the Chernivtsi Art Museum published a catalog of the artist's life and work.

References

External links 

 Augusta Kochanowska on ArtNet.com

1868 births
1927 deaths
Polish women painters
University of Applied Arts Vienna alumni
19th-century Polish painters